The 2016–17 TSG 1899 Hoffenheim season is the 118th season in the football club's history and 9th consecutive and overall season in the top flight of German football, the Bundesliga, having been promoted from the 2. Bundesliga in 2008. 1899 Hoffenheim will also participate in this season's edition of the domestic cup, the DFB-Pokal. It is the 8th season for Hoffenheim in the WIRSOL Rhein-Neckar-Arena, located in Sinsheim, Germany. The season covers a period from 1 July 2016 to 30 June 2017.

Players

Squad

Competitions

Overview

Bundesliga

League table

Results summary

Results by round

Matches

DFB-Pokal

Statistics

Appearances and goals

|-
! colspan=14 style=background:#dcdcdc; text-align:center| Goalkeepers

|-
! colspan=14 style=background:#dcdcdc; text-align:center| Defenders

|-
! colspan=14 style=background:#dcdcdc; text-align:center| Midfielders

|-
! colspan=14 style=background:#dcdcdc; text-align:center| Forwards

|-
! colspan=14 style=background:#dcdcdc; text-align:center| Players transferred out during the season

Goalscorers

Last updated: 13 May 2017

Clean sheets

Last updated: 20 May 2017

Disciplinary record

Last updated: 20 May 2017

References

TSG 1899 Hoffenheim seasons
Hoffenheim